Garrya fadyenii is a species of flowering shrub known by the common name Fadyen's silktassel. It is native to the West Indies, specifically Jamaica, Hispaniola, and the former Cuban provinces of Oriente and Santa Clara (Las Villas). It grows in rocky areas of mountainous tropical rainforests.

Along with Vaccinium cubense, it is a principal wide-leaved plant in the Hispaniolan pine forests ecoregion.

Description
The shrub is dioecious, with male and female plants producing similarly arranged inflorescences surrounded by lanceolate bracts.

References

Garryales
Flora of Cuba
Flora of Jamaica
Flora of Haiti
Flora of the Dominican Republic